The Casanova Killer may refer to:
Paul John Knowles (1946–1974)
Glen Edward Rogers (born 1962)